B.A.R.S. The Barry Adrian Reese Story  is the third studio album by American rapper Cassidy. It was released under Full Surface Records/J Records. Before its release, XXL Magazine ranked the album the 10th most anticipated album of 2007. The album debuted at #10 on the Billboard 200 with 63,000 copies sold in the first week released.

Background 
The album was originally titled This Time Around, then it was changed to It Is What It Is and finally to B.A.R.S. The Barry Adrian Reese Story. Cassidy named the album B.A.R.S. after spending 8 months behind bars (in prison). B.A.R.S are also his initials, Barry Adrian Reese [Story]. The album features songs about his accident and his time in jail as well as his relationship with God. He also created a B.A.R.S. Competition Freestyle Battle with finalists, G.O.D. Jewels, 21, of Chicago, IL, Rocky, 17, of Detroit, MI, and Lil' Chugga, 23, of, Columbia, TN on October 10, 2007 live on MTV's Sucker Free.

Production 
Producer Swizz Beatz handled some of the production on the album. The album was released on Swizz Beatz's Full Surface Records imprint, a subsidiary of J Records. Other producers involved with the project were Neo Da Matrix, Don Cannon, Kanye West, Bink, Hi-Tek, and others.

Swizz Beatz confirmed before the album's release that Sean Garrett would have production credits on this album: 

Cassidy himself produced the track "All By Myself" which sampled "Me, Myself & I" by The Dramatics.

Three promotional mixtapes called "The Hustlas Home", "The Hustlas Home Pt.2", and "07-07-07" were released before the CD.

Features 
Guest appearances include Swizz Beatz, Bone Thugs-N-Harmony, Eve, Angie Stone, Larsiny, Mashonda, Mark Morrison, Rell and John Legend.

"Celebrate" featuring John Legend samples jazz singer Nina Simone's version of the song "Strange Fruit."

Track listing

Charts

Weekly charts

Year-end charts

References

External links 
 https://www.myspace.com/cassidy
 https://www.myspace.com/cassidypromotions
  Cassidy Bars Album Review 
 Cassidy B.A.R.S. Album Review

2007 albums
Cassidy (rapper) albums
J Records albums
Full Surface Records albums
Albums produced by Devo Springsteen
Albums produced by Swizz Beatz
Albums produced by Nottz
Albums produced by Hi-Tek
Albums produced by Bink (record producer)
Ruff Ryders Entertainment albums
Albums produced by Neo da Matrix